Legend is a British television channel, formerly known as The Horror Channel, which launched in 2004, then subsequently renamed Zone Horror (2006–2010), and simply, Horror Channel (2010–2022). It was rebranded Legend in 2022, along with an additional channel, HorrorXtra. It has aired many horror, science fiction and action films alongside genre-based television series.  The following is a list of past films (theatrical, independent, direct-to-video, television films and short films) on Horror.

Notes: A television film that contains two or more parts is classed as a 'mini-series', therefore they will be included on main Horror (Horror Channel) article (see Programmes section). Some of the titles below contain their alternative title and not their original title. These are the titles they received by Horror (The Horror Channel).

0–9

A

B

C

D

E

F

G

H

I

J

K

L

M

N

O

P

Q

R

S

T

U

V

W

X

Y

Z

Short films

HorrorXtra
In June 2022, Horror was split into two new channels by CBS-AMC Networks, Legend and HorrorXtra, with HorrorXtra continuing to broadcast a mix of horror cinema, suspense films, futuristic fantasy and science fiction films alongside series such as Battlestar Galactica and Mutant X.

List of films broadcast by HorrorXtra in 2022
 Descent (2005 Terry Cunningham)
 Discarnate (2018 Mario Sorrenti)
 Ice Quake (2010 Paul Ziller)
 Matriarch (2019 Scott Vickers)
 The Rezort (2015 Steve Barker)
 Rupture (2016 Steven Shainberg)
 Shark Season (2020 Jared Cohn)

References

External links
 Legend official site

Legend